Wilhelm Aarek (17 April 1907 – 26 December 1999) was a Norwegian philologist and educationalist.

He was a cand.philol. by education, and was appointed as a lecturer in English language at Kristiansand Teacher's College in 1938. He had also applied for a job at Stavanger Cathedral School, but was rejected by the government. At Kristiansand Teacher's College he soon began writing books about pedagogy as well as his original field of philology. He served rector of the college from 1948 to 1976. He was decorated with the Royal Norwegian Order of St. Olav, and died in 1999.

References

1907 births
1999 deaths
Norwegian philologists
Norwegian educators
Academic staff of the University of Agder
Rectors of universities and colleges in Norway
20th-century philologists